"Mama Knows" is a song written by Tony Haselden and Tim Mensy, and recorded by American country music group Shenandoah. It was released in August 1988 as the first single from their album The Road Not Taken. The song reached number 5 on the Billboard Hot Country Singles & Tracks chart in December 1988.

Chart performance

References

1988 singles
1988 songs
Shenandoah (band) songs
Songs written by Tim Menzies
Columbia Records singles
Songs written by Tony Haselden